Patrica N. Ndogu is a member of the Pan-African Parliament from Nigeria.

References

Ndogu, Patrica N
Living people
Year of birth missing (living people)
Place of birth missing (living people)
21st-century Nigerian women politicians
21st-century Nigerian politicians
Women members of the Pan-African Parliament